Traisen (pronunciation in local German dialect ) is a town in the district of Lilienfeld in the Austrian state of Lower Austria.

Population

Personalities
Rupert Hollaus (1931–1954) was an Austrian Grand Prix motorcycle road racer who competed for the NSU factory racing team. He is the only Austrian to win a road racing World Championship.
Kurt Krieger (1926–1970), nicknamed "Dutch", was a Major League Baseball player who played pitcher from 1949 to 1951.

References

Cities and towns in Lilienfeld District